Hastings Farmstead is a historic home and farm complex located at Dickinson Center in Franklin County, New York.  The house was built in 1896 and is a "T" shaped building with a -story main block, built of balloon frame construction with clapboard siding and decorative shingles in the Victorian style. Attached to the rear of the main block is a -story wing that was built originally in the 1820s as a summer kitchen and pantry.  Also on the property are seven outbuildings built between 1820 and 1940.  They include five barns, a springhouse / milk house, and garage.

It was listed on the National Register of Historic Places in 2007.

References

External links

Houses on the National Register of Historic Places in New York (state)
Houses completed in 1896
Houses in Franklin County, New York
National Register of Historic Places in Franklin County, New York